The Bamboo Prison is a 1954 American Korean War film–drama film directed by Lewis Seiler and starring Robert Francis, Brian Keith, Dianne Foster, and Jerome Courtland. The working title was I Was a Prisoner in Korea. The US Army denied their co-operation to the producers.

Due to Cold War hysteria, the film was falsely accused of communist sympathies, with several US cities banning it, although the film is clear that Sgt. Rand was actually a spy for the US, pretending to be a sympathizer.

The brainwashing and abuse of American prisoners of war during the Korean War was also dramatized in P.O.W. (1953), Prisoner of War (1954, starring Ronald Reagan), and The Manchurian Candidate (1962, starring Frank Sinatra).

Plot

A group of American soldiers is held in a prisoner-of-war camp in North Korea in the final phase of the Korean War.  Prisoners who show sympathy with the communist cause are given special privileges, but are understandably hated by the other prisoners, who see them as traitors.

The camp "brain-washer", Comrade Clayton, is permitted to have his beautiful Russian wife, Tanya, live in camp. Sergeant Rand, one of the communist sympathizers (known as Progressives), falls in love with her, and his special privileges permit him to go to her house. However, she is not a communist sympathizer. Meanwhile. the camp priest, Father Dolan, is actually an impostor, trying to glean information through confession. Despite their differences, Rand helps his rival, Corporal Brady, to escape.

At the end of the war, Sgt. Rand stays in North Korea as an American intelligence agent posing a man disillusioned with the capitalist system and its exploitation of the working man.

Cast
Robert Francis as M/Sgt. John A. Rand
Dianne Foster as Tanya Clayton
Brian Keith as Cpl. Brady
Jerome Courtland as Arkansas
E.G. Marshall as Father Francis Dolan
Jack Kelly as Slade
Earle Hyman as Doc Jackson
Richard Loo as Commandant Hsai Tung
Keye Luke as Comrade-Instructor Li Ching
Murray Matheson as Comrade Clayton
King Donovan as Pop
Pepe Hern as Ramírez
Dickie Jones as Jackie
Leo Gordon as Pike
Weaver Levy as Meatball
Robert "Buzz" Henry as a Progressive
Eddie Ryder as Jones
Aaron Spelling as Skinny

References

External links

1954 films
1954 drama films
1950s war drama films
1950s spy films
American war drama films
Columbia Pictures films
Films directed by Lewis Seiler
Korean War prisoner of war films
American black-and-white films
1950s English-language films
1950s American films